Meis is a municipality in Galicia, Spain in the province of Pontevedra.

Meis can also be referred to as a name originating from Germany.

References

Municipalities in the Province of Pontevedra